Franco Sovilla (born 8 August 1957 in Venice, Italy) is an Italian curler.

Teams

References

External links
 

Living people
1957 births
Sportspeople from Venice
Italian male curlers